William Davenport Griffen (1894 Millbrook, New York – 1986 San Rafael, California) was an American artist and muralist.

Education
He graduated from Iowa State University and studied at the Chicago Academy of Fine Arts and at the Art Institute of Chicago. In 1928, he won the $750 John Quincy Adams scholarship to the Art Institute.

Career

He worked for the Illinois Works Progress Administration. For the Treasury Department's Section of Painting and Sculpture, he painted a mural at the Flora, Illinois post office, Good News and Bad, in 1937. He painted a second post office mural in Carmi, Illinois titled Service to the Farmer, in 1939. His works are displayed at the Pennsylvania Academy of the Fine Arts, Smithsonian American Art Museum, and the Whitney Museum of American Art. His work was exhibited at the Carnegie Institute, Corcoran gallery of art, Pennsylvania academy of the Fine arts and the Art Institute of Chicago and more

References

External links
 http://www.richardnortongallery.com/?loc=artists&id=670
 http://www.annexgalleries.com/artists/biography/874/Griffen/William
 http://www.artic.edu/aic/libraries/research/specialcollections/aic/exhibitions/1930/1931.html
 "Davenport Griffen Has Good Paintings in Current Show", Chicago Daily Tribune, Eleanor Jewett, December 12, 1929

1894 births
1986 deaths
Iowa State University alumni
People from Millbrook, New York
Artists from New York (state)
School of the Art Institute of Chicago alumni
American muralists
20th-century American painters
American male painters
20th-century American male artists
Section of Painting and Sculpture artists